The Oakley Academy was a high school operated by the Church of Jesus Christ of Latter-day Saints (LDS Church) located in Oakley, Idaho. It was founded in 1901. By 1906, it had 130 students and six teachers, and its building and grounds were valued at $12,000 dollars.

References

1901 establishments in Idaho
Defunct Christian schools in the United States
Defunct schools in Idaho
Educational institutions established in 1901
Private high schools in Idaho
Schools in Cassia County, Idaho